Luis Eduardo Zapata Zapata (born 24 April 1980) is a Colombian football defender who currently plays for Fort Lauderdale Strikers.

Club career
Zapata began his career with Millonarios, making his debut in the Colombian top flight during the 2001 season. Since making his debut with Millonarios, Zapata was a regular starter at left back and was known primarily for his speed. During the 2004 season he was sent on loan to Deportivo Cali and had an extraordinary season before returning to Millonarios. He is nicknamed "El Morumbí", for his goal in a Copa Sudamericana 2007 match played in São Paulo, Brasil against São Paulo FC which gave  Millonarios an unprecedented victory.

In 2008, he left his longtime club and signed with Deportivo Pereira. He remained at the club for six months and appeared in 13 matches during that time. For the second half of the 2009 season Zapata joined América de Cali. He only remained at the club for six months as he and sixteen other players were let go at the end of the season.

In July 2010 Zapata signed with Venezuelan club Caracas F.C. After one season in Venezuela Zapata signed with Wilstermann of Bolivia for the clubs Copa Libertadores campaign. While with Wilstermann he appeared in two Copa matches. After a brief stay in Bolivia the Colombian defender signed with Deportivo Pasto. In his first year at the club he helped Pasto in capturing the Primera B title and gain promotion to the Liga Postobón.

After a three-week trial, Zapata signed with Colorado Rapids of Major League Soccer.

References

External links
 
 
 asmsoccer.com profile
 Colombianos en Venezuela 

1980 births
Living people
Footballers from Cali
Colombian footballers
Millonarios F.C. players
Deportivo Cali footballers
Deportivo Pereira footballers
América de Cali footballers
Caracas FC players
C.D. Jorge Wilstermann players
Deportivo Pasto footballers
Colorado Rapids players
Fort Lauderdale Strikers players
Colombian expatriate footballers
Expatriate footballers in Venezuela
Expatriate footballers in Bolivia
Expatriate soccer players in the United States
Categoría Primera A players
Categoría Primera B players
Major League Soccer players
North American Soccer League players
Association football defenders